This is a list of lighthouses in Åland.

Lighthouses

See also 
 List of lighthouses and lightvessels in Finland
 Lists of lighthouses and lightvessels

References

External links 

 

Aland Islands
Lighthouses